Hamza Çalışkan (born 13 November 1994) is a Turkish Paralympian para table tennis player of class 5. A graduate of Selçuk University, he serves also as a coach. He resides oin Konya in Turkey. 
He is taking part in the 2020 Summer Paralympics.

Hamza çalışkan

References

1994 births
Living people
Sportspeople from Konya
Selçuk University alumni
Turkish male table tennis players
Paralympic table tennis players of Turkey
Table tennis players at the 2020 Summer Paralympics
21st-century Turkish people